Šamudovce is a village and municipality in Michalovce District in the Kosice Region of eastern Slovakia.

History
In historical records the village was first mentioned in 1315.

Geography
The village lies at an altitude of 108 metres and covers an area of 4.842 km2. The municipality has a population of 552 people.
The most famous people coming from the village are Peťo Mojcik, Ján and Drahuš Hreňo, Robert Demko and Michal Pavlov.

Culture
It has a small public library
The greatest artists in village are painter Martina Miženková (called Beďa) and multiinstrumentalist Robert Demko (called Demkáč). Good guitarist is also Peťo Mojcik (called Beďo).
Best photographer is Ján Hreňo (called Jančo). Nonetheless, Ján Hreňo's career has been interrupted in late 2016, following an extensive police investigation into several cases of bestiality in the region. Drahuš Hreňo (called Perduško) is a doctor and brilliant polka-dancer. Michal Pavlov (called Miťo) is famous car constructor.
Lucia Miženková (called Egreš) is the most beautiful nurse in Michalovce region.

See also
 List of municipalities and towns in Michalovce District
 List of municipalities and towns in Slovakia

External links
http://www.statistics.sk/mosmis/eng/run.html

Villages and municipalities in Michalovce District